Avensa Flight 358 was a scheduled airline flight from Maturín Airport to Simón Bolívar International Airport in Venezuela that crashed on 22 December 1974 killing all 75 people on board.

Aircraft 
The aircraft involved was a seven-year-old DC-9-14, which had been delivered to Avensa from McDonnell Douglas in 1967.

Accident 
On 22 December 1974, the McDonnell Douglas DC-9, with 69 passengers and 6 crew on board, took off on runway 05 from Maturín Airport. Five minutes after takeoff the pilots declared an emergency to the control tower. The pilots lost control of the aircraft and crashed  from the city of Maturín, Venezuela. All 75 on board the flight perished.

Cause 
Venezuelan authorities and the United States National Transportation Safety Board (NTSB) investigated the accident. The cause of the accident was not determined, though an elevator malfunction was considered.

In popular culture 
This accident was briefly featured on the Globovisión channel on 23 February 2008, due to the crash of Santa Bárbara Airlines Flight 518.

See also 

 Aviation accidents and incidents
 List of aircraft accidents and incidents resulting in at least 50 fatalities
 List of accidents and incidents involving commercial aircraft

Similar accidents 
 Southern Airways Flight 242
 British Airways Flight 009
 Gimli Glider
 TACA Flight 110
 Avianca Flight 52
 Scandinavian Airlines System Flight 751
 Garuda Indonesia Flight 421

References

External links 

 https://www.youtube.com/watch?v=Xg-tNN06lXs

http://www.volarenvenezuela.com/vev/modules.php?name=News&file=article&sid=1236

Aviation accidents and incidents in Venezuela
Accidents and incidents involving the McDonnell Douglas DC-9
Avensa accidents and incidents
Aviation accidents and incidents in 1974
1974 in Venezuela
December 1974 events in South America 
1974 disasters in Venezuela 

Airliner accidents and incidents with an unknown cause